Lady Emma Barrett-Lennard (1832 – 8 June 1916) was a British songwriter and novelist. 

She was born Emma Wood in 1832, the daughter of Reverend Sir John Page Wood, 2nd Baronet and novelist Emma Caroline Wood, daughter of Admiral Sampson Michell.  Her siblings included Katharine O'Shea, Field Marshal Sir Henry Evelyn Wood, and novelist Anna Caroline Steele.  In 1853, she married Sir Thomas Barrett-Lennard, 2nd Baronet.  They had five daughters and three sons.

Emma Barrett-Lennard was a prolific songwriter.  "Plymouth Hoe" and the patriotic song "Canadian Guns" were her two most famous works.  She also set a number of literary works to music, including works by her mother and sister, Alfred Lord Tennyson, and others.  She also wrote one novel, Constance Rivers.  Lady Emma Barrett-Lennard died on 8 June 1916.

Bibliography 

 Constance Rivers.  3 vol.  London: Hurst and Blackett, 1867.

References 

 

Created via preloaddraft
1832 births
1916 deaths
British women songwriters
British women novelists